This is a list of awards and nominations received by American rapper, songwriter and record producer J. Cole.

American Music Awards

!
|-
|rowspan=2|2012
|Himself
|New Artist of the Year
|
|rowspan=2|
|-
|Cole World: The Sideline Story
|rowspan=2|Favorite Rap/Hip Hop Album
|
|-
|2015
|2014 Forest Hills Drive
|
|
|}

BET Awards

!
|-
|2011
|rowspan=2|Himself
|Best New Artist 
|
|
|-
|rowspan=2|2012
|Best Male Hip Hop Artist 
|
|rowspan=2|
|-
|"Party (Remix)" (with Beyoncé)
|Best Collaboration
|
|-
|2014
|rowspan=3|Himself
|rowspan=3|Best Male Hip Hop Artist 
|
|
|-
|2016
|
|
|-
|rowspan=2|2017
|
|rowspan=2|
|-
|4 Your Eyez Only
|Album of the Year
|
|-
|2018
|Himself
|Best Male Hip Hop Artist 
|
|
|-
|rowspan=4|2019
|Himself
|Best Male Hip Hop Artist 
|
|rowspan=4|
|-
|rowspan=2|"A Lot" (with 21 Savage)
|Video of the Year
|
|-
|Best Collaboration
|
|-
|"Middle Child"
|Viewers' Choice Award
|
|-
|rowspan=1|2021
|Himself
|Best Male Hip Hop Artist 
|
|rowspan=1|
|-
|}

BET Hip Hop Awards

!
|-
|2011
|Friday Night Lights
|Best Mixtape
|
|
|-
|rowspan="6"|2012
|Cole World: The Sideline Story
|CD of the Year
|
|rowspan="6"|
|-
|rowspan="4"|Himself
|MVP of the Year
|
|-
|Producer of the Year
|
|-
|Lyricist of the Year
|
|-
|Best Live Performer
|
|-
|"Nobody's Perfect" 
|Reese's Perfect Combo Award (Best collaboration)
|
|-
|rowspan="10"|2013
|Born Sinner
|Album of the Year
|
|rowspan="10"|
|-
|rowspan="4"|"Power Trip" 
|Best Collabo, Duo or Group
|
|-
|Best Hip-Hop Video
|
|-
|Track of the Year
|
|-
|People's Champ Award
|
|-
|rowspan="4"|Himself
|MVP of the Year
|
|-
|Producer of the Year
|
|-
|Lyricist of the Year
|
|-
|Best Live Performer
|
|-
|rowspan="2"|"Crooked Smile" 
|Impact Track
|
|-
|rowspan="2"|2014
|Best Hip Hop Video
|
|rowspan="2"|
|-
|rowspan="6"|Himself
|rowspan="2"|Lyricist of the Year
|
|-
|rowspan="8"|2015
|
|rowspan="8"|
|-
|MVP of the Year
|
|-
|Producer of the Year
|
|-
|Best Live Performer
|
|-
|Hustler of the Year
|
|-
|2014 Forest Hills Drive
|Album of the Year
|
|-
|"Apparently"
|rowspan="3"|Impact Track
|
|-
|"Be Free"
|
|-
|rowspan="3"|2016
|"Love Yourz"
|
|rowspan="3"|
|-
|rowspan="2"|Himself
|Hot Ticket Performer
|
|-
|Lyricist of the Year
|
|-
|rowspan="3"|2017
|4 Your Eyez Only
|Album of the Year
|
|rowspan="3"|
|-
|rowspan="2"|Himself
|Hot Ticket Performer
|
|-
|Lyricist of the Year
|
|-
|rowspan="3"|2018
|KOD
|Album of the Year
|
|rowspan="3"|
|-
|rowspan="4"|Himself
|MVP of the Year
|
|-
|rowspan="2"|Lyricist of the Year
|
|-
|rowspan="8"|2019
|
|rowspan="8"|
|-
|MVP of the Year
|
|-
|Revenge of the Dreamers III
|Album of the Year
|
|-
|rowspan="4"|"A Lot" (with 21 Savage)
|Best Hip Hop Video
|
|-
|Best Collabo, Duo or Group
|
|-
|Sweet 16: Best Featured Verse
|
|-
|rowspan="2"|Impact Track
|
|-
|"Middle Child"
|
|-
|rowspan="2"|2020
|Himself
|Lyricist of the Year
|
|rowspan="2"|
|-
|"Snow on tha Bluff"
|Impact Track
|
|-
|rowspan="3"|2021
|rowspan="2"|Himself
|Artist of the Year
|
|rowspan="3"|
|-
|Lyricist of the Year
|
|-
|The Off-Season
| Album of the Year
|
|-
|}

Billboard Music Awards

!
|-
||2014
|Born Sinner
|rowspan="2"|Top Rap Album
|
|
|-
|rowspan="2"|2015
|2014 Forest Hills Drive
|
|rowspan="2"|
|-
|rowspan="2"|Himself
|rowspan="2"|Top Rap Artist
|
|-
|rowspan=2|2017
|
|rowspan=2|
|-
|4 Your Eyez Only
|Top Rap Album
|
|-
|2018
|4 Your Eyez Only World Tour
|rowspan=2|Top Rap Tour
|
|
|-
|2022
|The Off-Season Tour
|
|
|}

Grammy Awards

MTV Europe Music Awards

!
|-
|2018
|Wireless Festival
|Best World Stage
|
| 
|-
|2019
|Himself
|Best Hip-Hop
|
|
|}

MTV Video Music Awards

!
|-
|2013
|"Power Trip" 
|Best Hip Hop
|
|
|-
|2014
|"Crooked Smile" 
|Best Video with a Social Message
|
|
|-
|rowspan="2"|2018
|rowspan="2"|"ATM (Addicted to Money)"
|Best Art Direction
|
|rowspan="2"|
|-
|rowspan="2"| Best Hip Hop
|
|-
|rowspan="3"|2019
|rowspan="2"|"A Lot" (with 21 Savage)
|
|rowspan="3"|
|-
|Video of the Year
|
|-
|"The London" (with Travis Scott and Young Thug)
|Song of the Summer
|
|-
|}

MTVU Woodie Awards

!
|-
|2012
|Himself
|Woodie of the Year: Series of Popular Mixtapes 
|
|
|}

NAACP Image Awards

!
|-
|rowspan="3"|2016
|rowspan="3"|"No Sleeep" (with Janet Jackson) 
|Outstanding Duo, Group or Collaboration
|
|rowspan="3"|
|-
|Outstanding Music Video
|
|-
|Outstanding Song, Contemporary
|
|-
|rowspan="1"|2020
|"Shea Butter Baby" (with Ari Lennox)
| Outstanding Duo, Group or Collaboration
|
|rowspan="1"|
|-
|rowspan="2"|2022
|Himself
|Outstanding Male Artist
|
|rowspan="2"|
|-
|"My Life" (with 21 Savage) 
|Outstanding Hip Hop/Rap Song
|
|}

Soul Train Music Awards

!
|-
|2012
|Himself
|Best New Artist 
|
|
|-
|rowspan=3|2013
|rowspan=2"|Power Trip" featuring Miguel
|Best Hip-Hop Song of the Year
|
|rowspan=3|
|-
|Best Collaboration
|
|-
|"Crooked Smile" featuring TLC
|The Ashford and Simpson Songwriter's Award
|
|-
|2015
|"Apparently"
|The Ashford and Simpson Songwriter's Award
|
|
|-
|rowspan=4|2019
| "A Lot" (with 21 Savage)
|rowspan=2|Best Hip-Hop Song Of The Year
|
|rowspan=4|
|-
|"Middle Child"
|
|-
| "Shea Butter Baby" (with Ari Lennox)
|rowspan=2|Best Collaboration Performance
|
|-
| "Purple Emoji" (with Ty Dolla Sign)
|
|}

References

Awards
Cole, J.